Erento is the largest online rental marketplace in Germany. Founded in 2003 by Chris Müller and Uwe Kampschulte as a Berlin start-up, Erento currently operates in the UK, Finland, Austria, Germany and Switzerland.

History 
The company was founded in 2003 by Chris Müller and Uwe Kampschulte as an online marketplace for rental items within Germany. Erento quickly grew to Europe's largest rental marketplace, with locations in Germany, the UK, Austria and Switzerland. In 2006, Erento offered approximately 200,000 items for rental. That number tripled to over 640,000 rental items offered on Erento in 2007.

In 2007, Holzbrinck Ventures, one of Germany's largest, most successful venture funds raised its holding in Erento to 13 percent. Later in 2009, founder Uwe Kampschulte left the company and was replaced by Oliver Weyergraf.

In November 2013, Erento grew again by acquiring Finnish online rental platform iRent.fi. As a result of this merger, Erento now operates actively in Germany, Austria, Switzerland, the UK and Finland.

Business progress 
The customers of Erento offer their rental items to Erento's website visitors. These rental items include physical wares, like sports cars, tools or mobile homes, as well as services.

In 2010, the business model was transformed from a commission model to a contact based model. With this contact model, Erento customers can offer a certain number of articles online each month. The items are then advertised via Erento's marketing networks. When a user searches for an item, the contact details of the customer renting the good or service, such as website and phone number, are shared directly with the public.

References

Online marketplaces of Germany
Companies based in Berlin
Sharing economy
Social networking websites
2003 establishments in Germany
Internet properties established in 2003